Sant'Alessio in Aspromonte is a comune (municipality) in the Metropolitan City of Reggio Calabria in the Italian region Calabria, located about  southwest of Catanzaro and about  northeast of Reggio Calabria.  

Sant'Alessio in Aspromonte borders the following municipalities: Laganadi, Reggio Calabria, Santo Stefano in Aspromonte.

References

Cities and towns in Calabria